Keystone Hotel may refer to:

Keystone Hotel (Castle Rock, Colorado), listed on the National Register of Historic Places in Douglas County, Colorado
Keystone Hotel (Hummelstown, Pennsylvania), listed on the National Register of Historic Places in Dauphin County, Pennsylvania
Keystone Hotel (Lampasas, Texas), Recorded Texas Historic Landmark
Keystone Hotel (McCook, Nebraska), listed on the National Register of Historic Places in Red Willow County, Nebraska
Keystone Hotel (film), a 1935 short film directed by Ralph Staub